Ignacio Gutiérrez (14 May 1913 – 4 April 1976) was a Mexican swimmer. He competed in two events at the 1932 Summer Olympics.

References

External links
 

1913 births
1976 deaths
Mexican male swimmers
Olympic swimmers of Mexico
Swimmers at the 1932 Summer Olympics
Sportspeople from Colima